Ryan Lankford (born December 9, 1991) is a Canadian football wide receiver who is currently a free agent. He played college football for Illinois and signed with the Miami Dolphins as an undrafted free agent in 2014. He has been a member of the Indianapolis Colts, Saskatchewan Roughriders, Winnipeg Blue Bombers, Ottawa Redblacks, and BC Lions.

High school and college
Lankford played wide receiver, defensive back, kicker, punter, and also served as a kickoff and punt returner for Paxon School for Advanced Studies. He also lettered in track and field. Lankford then attended the University of Illinois at Urbana–Champaign, where he played 43 games and recorded 70 receptions for 1,014 receiving yards. He also played as a punter, averaging 39.4 yards on 19 punts. As a junior in 2012, Lankford led the team in receiving yards (469) and touchdowns (5).

Professional career

Miami Dolphins 
After going undrafted in 2014 Lankford signed with the Miami Dolphins on May 11, 2014, and was waived four days later.

Indianapolis Colts 
On May 18, he signed with the Indianapolis Colts. He was waived on August 30, and resigned to the practice squad on September 1. On January 19, 2015, he signed a reserve/future contract with the Colts. He was released by the Colts on August 31, 2016.

Saskatchewan Roughriders 
Lankford signed with the Saskatchewan Roughriders of the Canadian Football League (CFL) on November 7, 2015. He played in one game during their 2015 season. In his second season in the CFL Lankford saw more playing time, playing in 9 games, catching 19 passes for 165 yards. Despite the increased play time he was on, and off the practice roster multiple times during the season, and was ultimately released on October 25, 2016.

Winnipeg Blue Bombers 
On January 24, 2017, Lankford signed with the Winnipeg Blue Bombers (CFL).

Ottawa Redblacks 
Lankford signed with the Ottawa Redblacks on February 13, 2019, at the start of free agency. He played in three of the first four games of the season for Ottawa, but made a costly error on a punt return in Week 4 which lead to being dismissed from the team.

BC Lions 
On July 15, 2019, it was announced that Lankford had signed with the BC Lions.

Personal
Lankford's father, Paul, played cornerback for the Miami Dolphins from 1982 to 1991.

References

External links
 BC Lions profile
 Ryan Lankford profile at Colts.com
 Ryan Lankford at FightingIllini.com

1991 births
Living people
Players of American football from Jacksonville, Florida
Paxon School for Advanced Studies alumni
American football wide receivers
Canadian football wide receivers
American players of Canadian football
Illinois Fighting Illini football players
Miami Dolphins players
Indianapolis Colts players
Saskatchewan Roughriders players
Winnipeg Blue Bombers players
Canadian football return specialists
Ottawa Redblacks players
BC Lions players